Yui Kamiji defeated Aniek van Koot in the final, 6–2, 6–2 to win the women's singles wheelchair tennis title at the 2020 Australian Open.

Diede de Groot was the two-time defending champion, but was defeated by Zhu Zhenzhen in the quarterfinals.

Seeds

Draw

Bracket

References

External links
 Drawsheet on ausopen.com

Wheelchair Women's Singles
2020 Women's Singles